Harold "Harry" Hart (29 September 1926 – 2012) was an English professional footballer who played as a forward.

References

1926 births
2012 deaths
Footballers from Sheffield
English footballers
Association football forwards
Rotherham United F.C. players
Coventry City F.C. players
Grimsby Town F.C. players
Frickley Athletic F.C. players
Gainsborough Trinity F.C. players
Stocksbridge Works F.C. players
English Football League players